Der Goggolori is an opera in eight scenes and an epilogue by Wilfried Hiller to a German libretto by Michael Ende. The work was dedicated to Carl Orff; it was first performed  on 3 February 1985 at the Staatstheater am Gärtnerplatz in Munich.

It is based on Bavarian folk tale about conflict between Paganism and Christianity, set at the time of the Thirty Years' War.

Roles
The Goggolori (tenor)
Zeipoth, a farm girl (soprano)
Irwing, her father, weaver and farmer (bass)
Weberin (weaver), her mother (contralto)
Aberwin, a young musician and charcoal burner (bass)
The Hermit (spoken)
Ullerin, healer, barber and witch (bass with high falsetto)
Der Goggolori in another shape (spoken)
Puppeteers, farmers

References

Operas
German-language operas
1985 operas
Children's operas